Magatapalli is a village in Mamidikuduru Mandal, East Godavari district, Andhra Pradesh, India.

References 

Villages in East Godavari district